Finland competed at the 2022 Winter Olympics in Beijing, China, from 4 to 20 February 2022.

Ice hockey player Valtteri Filppula was the country's flagbearer during the opening ceremony. Cross-country skier Krista Pärmäkoski was the flagbearer during the closing ceremony.

Finland's final medal haul of two gold and eight total medals, including its first ever ice hockey gold, marked its best showing since winning four golds in 2002 and nine medals in 2006.

Medalists

The following Finnish competitors won medals at the games. In the discipline sections below, the medalists' names are bolded.

|align="left" valign="top"|

Competitors
The following is the list of number of competitors participating at the Games per sport/discipline.

Alpine skiing

By meeting the basic qualification standards Finland qualified one male and one female alpine skier, and then added two more female quotas during reallocation. The four athletes chosen were named on January 24.

Biathlon

Finland has qualified four male and four female biathletes. The Finnish Olympic Committee named Mari Eder, Olli Hiidensalo and Tero Seppälä on December 20, 2021. The rest of the biathletes were named on January 24.

Men

Women

Mixed

Cross-country skiing

Finland has qualified six male and seven female cross-country skiers. The 13 skiers chosen where fully announced on 12 January 2022.

Distance
Men

 Men's 50 km freestyle was shortened to 28.4 km due to weather conditions.

Women

Sprint
Men

Women

Figure skating

In the 2021 World Figure Skating Championships in Stockholm, Sweden, Finland secured one quota in the ladies singles competition. Finnish Olympic committee named Juulia Turkkila and Matthias Versluis for the ice dance competetion on December 20, 2021. Jenni Saarinen was named as the remaining competitor on January 24.

Freestyle skiing

Freeski
Men

Women

Moguls

Ice hockey

Summary

Finland has qualified 25 male competitors and 23 female competitors to the ice hockey tournaments.

Men's tournament

Finland men's national ice hockey team qualified by being ranked 3rd in the 2019 IIHF World Rankings.

Team roster

Group play

Quarterfinals

Semifinals

Gold medal game

Women's tournament

Finland women's national ice hockey team qualified by being ranked 3rd in the 2020 IIHF World Rankings.

Team roster

Group play

Quarterfinals

Semifinals

Bronze medal game

Nordic Combined

Ski jumping

Snowboarding

Freestyle
Men

Women

See also
Finland at the 2022 Winter Paralympics

References

Nations at the 2022 Winter Olympics
2022
Winter Olympics